The Audiovisual Media Services Directive 2010 (2010/13/EU) is an EU law Directive on broadcasting, television and radio.

Contents
Article 1(1)(a) defines an audiovisual media services to mean those ‘devoted to providing programmes, under the editorial responsibility of a media service provider, to the general public, in order to inform, entertain or educate, to the general public by electronic communications networks’, either on TV or an ‘on-demand’ service. An ‘on-demand’ service involves ‘viewing of programmes at the moment chosen by the user and at his individual request on the basis of a catalogue of programmes selected by the media service provider’. This includes 'editorial responsibility' under article 1(1)(c). 

Article 6 says Member states must ensure audiovisual services ‘do not contain any incitement to hatred’ based on race, sex, religion, nationality or other protected characteristics.

Article 7 requires services are made ‘more accessible to persons with disabilities’.

Article 9 prohibits media with ‘surreptitious’ communication or ‘subliminal’ techniques, to ‘prejudice respect for human dignity’, that would ‘promote any discrimination’, prejudice health and safety or ‘encourage behaviour grossly prejudicial to the protection of the environment’.

Article 28b requires that video-sharing platform providers protect (a) minors from content that "may impair their physical, mental or moral development", (b) the general public from content "containing incitement to violence or hatred", and (c) the general public from content whose dissemination is criminal in EU law, such as terrorism, child pornography or offences concerning racism or xenophobia.

Proposed amendments, 2023
The EU Commission proposed amending the Directive with a new "Media Freedom Act". This proposed a new European Board for Media Services with coordination and opinion giving powers, composed of member state regulator representatives.

See also
EU law

Notes

External links
Text of the Directive 2010/13/EU

European Union directives